Guglielmo Scheibmeier (born 26 May 1924) is an Italian bobsledder who competed in the mid-1950s. He won a gold medal in the two-man event at the 1954 FIBT World Championships in Cortina d'Ampezzo.

References
Bobsleigh two-man world championship medalists since 1931

Italian male bobsledders
1934 births
Living people